Pennaraptora (Latin penna "bird feather" + raptor "thief", from rapere "snatch"; a feathered bird-like predator) is a clade defined as the most recent common ancestor of Oviraptor philoceratops, Deinonychus antirrhopus, and Passer domesticus (the house sparrow), and all descendants thereof, by Foth et al., 2014. 

The clade "Aviremigia" was conditionally proposed along with several other apomorphy-based clades relating to birds by Jacques Gauthier and Kevin de Queiroz in a 2001 paper. Their proposed definition for the group was "the clade stemming from the first panavian with ... remiges and rectrices, that is, enlarged, stiff-shafted, closed-vaned (= barbules bearing hooked distal pennulae), pennaceous feathers arising from the distal forelimbs and tail". Ancestral morphology relating to pennaceous feathers suggests that basal species of Pennaraptora were capable of scansorial locomotion and gliding, and further evolution of said adaptation within the clade would eventually give rise to the origin of flight in avian species.

See also
Evolution of birds
Origin of avian flight
Origin of birds

References 

Maniraptorans
Jurassic birds
Cretaceous birds
Cenozoic birds
Late Jurassic dinosaurs
Extant Late Jurassic first appearances